Laksh Lalwani (born 19 April 1996), also known as Lakshya, is an Indian actor. He played the titular warrior in Porus (2017–18), the most expensive Indian TV show budgeted at 500 crore.

Career

In 2015, Lakshya made his acting debut with television series Warrior High. He went on to play Yuvraj Madhav Shekhawat/Krish in the &TV series Adhuri Kahaani Hamari (2015–2016).

After doing an episode in Pyaar Tune Kya Kiya, Lakshya was cast in Pardes Mein Hai Mera Dil (2016–2017) as Veer Mehra. He attained widespread critical acclaim for his portrayal of the titular warrior in India's most expensive TV historical show Porus (2017–2018), costing 500 crore.

Lakshya is all set for Bollywood debut and will be launched by Karan Johar under Dharma Productions, who has signed a three-film contract with him. He was scheduled to debut with Johar's production Dostana 2 in 2021, which he also began filming in November 2019, but it has been delayed. He is now gearing up to debut with Johar and Shashank Khaitan's love triangle Bedhadak alongside Shanaya Kapoor and Gurfateh Pirzada, and will also feature in Johar's third Aaghat with Tanya Maniktala.

Filmography

Television

Awards and nominations

Notes

References

External links

1996 births
Living people
Indian male models
Indian male television actors
Male actors from Delhi
Sindhi people